Enugu North is a Local Government Area of Enugu State, Nigeria. Its headquarters are in the city of Enugu at Opkara Avenue. The LGA is made up of four main district areas Amaigbo Lane, Onuato, Umunevo and Ihenwuzi. Enugu North is one of the seventeen local  governments in Enugu state and also one of the three LGA's that made up the Enugu Town - plus Enugu East and Enugu South.
 
It has an area of 106 km and a population of 244,852 at the 2006 census

The postal code of the area is 400.

Geography 
Enugu North LGA has a land size of 106 square kilometers, and a population of 244,852 at the 2006 census and an average temperature of 27 degrees Celsius. The area's average humidity is 69 percent, and the LGA has two distinct seasons: dry and rainy, with a brief harmattan in the dry season.

Economy 
Enugu North LGA has a robust economy, including public and private institutions such as hotels, banks, recreational locations, and restaurants. There are also several boutiques, shopping malls (including the famed Polo Park Mall, which is now home to ShopRite), and marketplaces (including the Artisan Market) in the area. The LGA is also rich in Agriculture

Government

Wards 

 Asata Township
 China Town
 G.R.A
 Gui Newlayout
 Ihewuzi
 Independence Layout
 New Haven
 Ogbette East
 Ogbette West
 Ogui Township
 Onu-asata
 Udi Siding/iva Valley
 Umunevo

References

Enugu
Local Government Areas in Enugu State
Local Government Areas in Igboland